Desa Tun Hussein Onn is the Malaysian Armed Forces residential area in Kuala Lumpur, Malaysia. This special residential area is located near Setiawangsa in the south and Wangsa Maju in the north. It is located beside the Malaysian Ministry of Defence.

History
The special residential area was formerly part of Hawthornden Estate, which contained rubber plantations on previous mining land. It was developed into a housing estate specifically for the armed forces in 1990. It was named after Tun Hussein Onn, Third Malaysian Prime Minister.

The Desa Tun Hussein Onn housing development project built 2,016 units of flats, mostly for officers of lower rank, and this helped in a large way to satisfy the urgent housing requirements for the armed forces at the time.

Memorials
The roads were named after soldiers who died fighting against the Malayan Communist Party during Communist insurgency in Malaysia (1968–89) in Malaya and who were conferred the Seri Pahlawan Gagah Perkasa (SP), an award given to those who show extraordinary courage.

List of roads
Jalan Abdul Razak Hussin
Jalan Abdul Rashid
Jalan Lenggu ak China
Jalan Rosli Buang
Jalan Hamid Ismail
Jalan Saimun Tarikat
Jalan Mohana Chandran

Residential areas
 Flat Desa Tun Hussein Onn
 Malaysian Army Residential Flats

Education
Sekolah Kebangsaan Desa Tun Hussein Onn
Sekolah Menengah Kebangsaan Desa Tun Hussein Onn
Sekolah Agama Desa Tun Hussein Onn
Sekolah Kebangsaan Kementah

References

Military of Malaysia
Geography of Kuala Lumpur